Plasmacytosis is a condition in which there is an unusually large proportion of plasma cells in tissues, exudates, or blood.  Plasmacytosis may be divided into two types—cutaneous and systemic—both of which have identical skin findings.
Patients with plasmacytosis have been predominantly found to have lung infections (pneumonia, tuberculosis, abscess) whereas multiple myeloma is rarely found.

See also 
 Cutaneous B-cell lymphoma
 Multiple myeloma
 Plasmacytoma
 Skin lesion

References

External links 

Lymphocytic disorders